Charache is a surname. Notable people with this surname include:

 Patricia Charache (1929–2015), American infectologist
 Samuel Charache (1930–2019), American haematologist, husband of Patricia